Corby Town is an English football club based in Corby, Northamptonshire. They are currently members of the Southern Football League Division One Central. The Steelmen play their home games at Steel Park.

Key

Initials in the divisions column
 SFL = Southern Football League
 NPL = Northern Premier League

Key to positions and symbols
  = Champions
  = Runners-up
  = Promoted
  = Relegated
  = Transferred

Key to rounds
 PRE = Preliminary round
 QR1 = First qualifying round, etc.
 R1 = First round, etc.
 DNE = Did not enter
 N/A = Not applicable

List

Notes

References
General
 

Specific

Corby Town F.C.
Corby Town